The Leo Gershoy Award is a book prize awarded by the American Historical Association for the best publication in English dealing with the history of Europe in the seventeenth and eighteenth centuries. Endowed in 1975 by the Gershoy family and first awarded two years later, the prize commemorates Leo Gershoy, professor of French history at New York University. It was awarded biennially until 1985, and annually thereafter.

The first recipient of the award was Simon Schama; other distinguished honorees include Robert Darnton, John H. Elliott and Roy Porter. Carla Rahn Phillips of the University of Minnesota has uniquely won the prize on two occasions.

List of prizewinners 
Sourced from AHA
2021 — Susan North, Sweet & Clean? Bodies and Clothes in Early Modern England (Oxford Univ. Press)
2020 — Margaret E. Schotte, Sailing School: Navigating Science and Skill, 1550–1800 (Johns Hopkins Univ. Press)
2019 — Hugh G. Cagle, Assembling the Tropics: Science and Medicine in Portugal’s Empire, 1450-1700 (Cambridge Univ. Press)
2018 — James Delbourgo, Collecting the World: Hans Sloane and the Origins of the British Museum (Belknap Press).
2017 — Renaud Morieux, The Channel: England, France and the Construction of a Maritime Border in the 18th Century (Cambridge Univ. Press)
2016 — Alexandra Shepard, Accounting for Oneself: Worth, Status, and the Social Order in Early Modern England (Oxford Univ. Press)
2015 — John C. Rule and Ben Trotter, A World of Paper: Louis XIV, Colbert de Torcy, and the Rise of the Information State (McGill-Queens Univ. Press) 
2014 — Andy Wood, The Memory of the People: Custom and Popular Senses of the Past in Early Modern England 
2013 — Daniela Bleichmar, Visible Empire: Botanical Expeditions and Visual Culture in the Hispanic Enlightenment 
2012 — Ethan Shagan, The Rule of Moderation: Violence, Religion and the Politics of Restraint in Early Modern England 
2011 — Alexandra Walsham, The Reformation of the Landscape: Religion, Identity, and Memory in Early Modern Britain and Ireland 
2010 — Francesca Trivellato, The Familiarity of Strangers: The Sephardic Diaspora, Livorno, and Cross-Cultural Trade in the Early Modern Period 
2009 — Stuart B. Schwartz, All Can Be Saved: Religious Tolerance and Salvation in the Iberian Atlantic World 
2008 — Anne Goldgar, Tulipmania: Money, Honor, and Knowledge in the Dutch Golden Age 
2007 — Richard B. Sher, The Enlightenment and the Book: Scottish Authors and Their Publishers in 18th-Century Britain, Ireland, and America 
2006 — Howard G. Brown, Ending the French Revolution: Violence, Justice and Repression from the Terror to Napoleon 
2005 — Pamela H. Smith, The Body of the Artisan: Art and Experience in the Scientific Revolution 
2004 — Ronald B. Schechter,  Obstinate Hebrews: Representations of Jews in France, 1715-1815 
2003 — Joseph Eyitemi Inikori,  Africans and the Industrial Revolution in England: A Study in International Trade and Economic Development 
2002 — David A. Bell,  The Cult of the Nation in France: Inventing Nationalism, 1680-1800 
2001 — Jonathan Israel,  The Radical Enlightenment: Philosophy and the Making of Modernity, 1650-1750
2000 — Ruth Mackay, The Limits of Royal Authority: Resistance and Obedience in 17th-Century Castile
1999 — Adrian Johns, The Nature of the Book: Print and Knowledge in the Making 
1998 — Carla Rahn Phillips and William D. Phillips, Spain's Golden Fleece: Wool Production and the Wool Trade from the Middle Ages to the 19th Century
1997 — Timothy Tackett, Becoming a Revolutionary: The Deputies of the French National Assembly and the Emergence of a Revolutionary Culture, 1789-90
1996 — Isabel Hull,  Sexuality, State, and Civil Society in Germany, 1700-1815
1995 — J. Russell Major,  From Renaissance Monarchy to Absolute Monarchy: French Kings, Nobles, and Estates 
1994 — Isser Woloch, The New Regime: Transformations of the French Civic Order, 1789-1820s 
1993 — Jonathan Dewald,  Aristocratic Experience and the Origins of Modern Culture: France, 1570-1715
1992 — Joseph M. Levine, The Battle of the Books: History and Literature in the Augustan Age 
1991 — Helen Nader,  Liberty in Absolutist Spain: The Habsburg Sale of Towns, 1516-1700
1990 — Richard Herr, Rural Change and Royal Finances in Spain at the End of the Old Regime 
1989 — Nancy Nichols Barker, Brother to the Sun King: Philippe, Duke of Orléans 
1988 — Roy Porter, Mind-Forg'd Manacles: A History of Madness in England from the Restoration to the Regency 
1987 — Carla Rahn Phillips, Six Galleons for the King of Spain: Imperial Defense in the Early 17th Century
1986 — John M. Beattie,  Crime and the Courts in England, 1660-1800
1985 — J.H. Elliott,  Richelieu and Olivares
1983 — Marianne Elliott,  Partners in Revolution: The United Irishmen and France 
1981 — Richard S. Westfall,  Never At Rest: A Biography of Isaac Newton 
1979 — Robert Darnton, The Business of Enlightenment: A Publishing History of the Encyclopédie, 1775-1800
1977 — Simon Schama, Patriots and Liberators: Revolution in the Netherlands, 1780-1813

See also

 List of history awards

References

External links 

 AHA Gershoy Award description

History awards
American non-fiction literary awards
American Historical Association book prizes